Heilprinia is a genus of sea snails, marine gastropod mollusks in the subfamily Fusininae of the family Fasciolariidae, the spindle snails, the tulip snails and their allies.

Species
Species within the genus Heilprinia include:
 Heilprinia burnsii (Dall, 1890) †
 Heilprinia caloosaensis (Heilprin, 1886) †
 Heilprinia carolinensis (Dall, 1892) †
 Heilprinia coltrorum (Hadorn & Rogers, 2000)
 Heilprinia dianeae (Petuch, 1994) †
 Heilprinia diegelae Petuch, 1994 †
 Heilprinia dowiana (Olsson, 1954)
 Heilprinia exilis (Conrad, 1832) †
 Heilprinia hasta Petuch, 1994 †
 Heilprinia miamiensis Petuch, 1994 †
 Heilprinia portelli Petuch, 1994 †
 Heilprinia timessa (Dall, 1889)
Species brought into synonymy
 Heilprinia couei (Petit de la Saussaye, 1853): synonym of Aristofusus couei (Petit de la Saussaye, 1853)
 Heilprinia helenae (Bartsch, 1939) : synonym of Aristofusus helenae (Bartsch, 1939)
 Heilprinia lindae Petuch, 1987 : synonym of Heilprinia timessa (Dall, 1889)
 Heilprinia robusta (Trask, 1855) : synonym of Harfordia robusta (Trask, 1855)

References

 Vermeij G.J. & Snyder M.A. (2018). Proposed genus-level classification of large species of Fusininae (Gastropoda, Fasciolariidae). Basteria. 82(4-6): 57–82.

External links
 Grabau A.W. (1904). Phylogeny of Fusus and its allies. Smithsonian Miscellaneous Collections. 44(1417): i-iii, 1-157, pls 1-18

 
Gastropod genera